ASAN service is a state agency for public services to citizens of Azerbaijan. The agency's goal is to make services more easily accessible to citizens using modern technologies. The acronym “ASAN” stands for “Azerbaijan Service and Assessment Network”. The word “asan” means “easy” in Azerbaijani.

ASAN service, as part of the State Agency for Public Services and Social Innovations under the President of the Republic of Azerbaijan, is chaired by Ulvi Mehdiyev.

Entities and services 

“ASAN service” centers are “one-stop shop”-based locations that bring together representatives of 10 government entities and private companies providing services in a public-private partnership .  More than 300 services are provided, including birth, death and marriage registration; identity cards; passports; driver licenses; real estate records; immigrant status and other civic services. At the same time, functional support services, including banking, insurance, legal support, translation and other services are rendered at the center.

Services in the centers are rendered based on the "single space" approach. Thus, a citizen can benefit from various public and private services in one center (single administrative building) at the same time entering through only one door. While the State Agency (State Agency on Public Services and Social Innovations under the President of the Republic of Azerbaijan) manages the "space", government agencies are directly responsible for rendering their own services. The State Agency is responsible setting standards and principles and overseeing day-to-day functioning of the ASAN service centers, whereas the governmental agencies are responsible for providing quality service. Thus, there is neither duplication of functions, nor a conflict of interest between a standard setter and those applying these standards. The State Agency is an entirely new and neutral body that, in accordance with its status, sets standards, optimizes services, monitors and assesses service-providing entities.

Applications of over 41 million citizens have been received since inception of "ASAN service". Not surprisingly, the satisfaction of the citizens having accessed services stands at the rate of 99-100 percent.

"ASAN service" centers function on Monday - Friday from 09:00 am to 07:00 pm, and on Saturday and Sunday from 09:00 am to 05:00 pm (without break). About 30,000 citizens receive services by "ASAN service" daily.

Five key principles of "ASAN service" centers 

ASAN service ensures access to public services based on the following key principles:

Efficiency 

Efficient service delivery helps the citizens avoid unnecessary costs and save time. Thus, all necessary conditions are in place for taking a queue, obtaining information prior to applying for services and benefiting from the electronic services.

Transparency 

This is the core principle of ASAN service. In order to ensure transparency in ASAN service centers proactive methods have been used, and monitors, panels, information boards have been installed. Fees for services are paid through banks and payment terminals located in the centers. All operations and transactions in the centers are video recorded. This helps achieve the total elimination of bureaucratic hurdles and conditions conductive to corruption in the centers.

Comfort 

In order to provide comfort for the citizens in the centers internet-cafes, baby care rooms, children's playgrounds and self-service areas have been set up.

Politeness 

This principle aims at ensuring ethical behavior. "The citizen is always right" principle constitutes main the main purpose of ASAN service. In the process of realization of this approach, employees of the centers are constantly involved in training on efficient service delivery and ethical behavior.

Innovativeness 

Innovative methods are used with the aim of increasing the quality of services to the citizens through modern means.

Statistics 

Until today, applications of over 36 million citizens have been received. Mobile ASAN service began in 2013 and helps provide universal access for citizens. It uses buses that travel to deliver services in remote and hard-to-reach areas that do not have ASAN service centers. The agency also established intra-city mobile services in the capital city of Baku. By paying an additional fee, citizens can receive services at work, home or another location they choose. Public satisfaction rate is close to 100 percent.

Monitoring report by OECD in 2016 praised Azerbaijan "for advancing Azerbaijani Service and Assessment Network (ASAN) centres, which has contributed to eliminating the conditions that are conducive to corruption when delivering various administrative services to the public". Azerbaijan 2016 report by EEAS acknowledged ASAN services for eliminating corruption and removing bureaucracy in public service delivery.

The following table shows the anniversary applications registered in the "ASAN service" centers:

{| class="wikitable" style="margin:1em auto"
|-
! Amount !! Date !! Registered Center
|-
| 1 million || January 23, 2014 || "ASAN service" center No1
|-
| 2 million || colspan="2" | no information
|-
| 3 million || colspan="2" | no information
|-
| 4 million || colspan="2" | no information
|-
| 5 million || colspan="2" | ''no information|-
| 6 million || colspan="2" | no information
|-
| 7 million || December 2, 2015 || Sabirabad "ASAN center"
|-
| 8 million || February 11, 2016 || Mobile "ASAN service"
|-
| 9 million || colspan="2" | no information
|-
|10 million
|June 10, 2016
|Baku "ASAN service" center No5
|-
|11 million
| colspan="2" |no information
|-
|12 million
|October 20, 2016
|Baku "ASAN service" center No5
|-
|18 million
|October 30
|Gandja "ASAN service" center
|-
|19 million
|January 8, 2018
|Baku "ASAN service" center No5
|-
|21 million
|April 16, 2018
|Mobile "ASAN train"
|-
|22 million
| June 8, 2018
|Mobile "ASAN service"
|-
|23 million
| July 26, 2018
|Mobile "ASAN service"
|-
| 24 million
| September 10, 2018
| Sumgayit "ASAN service" center
|-
| 25 million
| November 5, 2018
| Baku "ASAN service" center No5
|-
| 26 million
| December 25, 2018
| Shaki "ASAN service" center
|-
| 27 million
| February 13, 2019
| Baku "ASAN Kommunal" center No1
|-
|28 million
|April 1, 2019
|Baku "ASAN service" center No4
|-
|29 million
|May 14, 2019
|Barda "ASAN service" center
|-
|33 million
|October 4, 2019
|Baku "ASAN service" center No2
|-
|34 million
|November 14, 2019
|Baku "ASAN service" center No3
|-
|35 million
|December 19, 2019
|Baku "ASAN service" center No5
|}

 Services in ASAN centers 

 Services provided by State Entities 

More than 300 different services in "ASAN service" centers enlisted by 10 state and private entities are rendered.Ministry of Justice Birth registration
 Death registration
 Wedlock registration
 Registration of divorce
 Registration of child adoption
 Registration of changes to the given name, patronymic and family name
 Registration of determination of paternity
 Issuance of certificates (renewed certificates) on state registration of civil status
 Notary serviceMinistry of Internal Affairs Issuance and renewal of identity cards
 Issuance and renewal of passport of citizen
 Renewal of driving licenses
 Reference note about the convictionMinistry of Taxes Registration of commercial legal persons and tax payersState Commission for Property Affairs Extracts of registration of property rights over the living houses (apartments), except the initial registration
 Reference note of state registration about restriction (encumbrance) of rights over real estateCustoms Committee Receipt of customs declaration and documents for customs clearanceState Migration Service Issuance of documents for permission for temporary residence and for obtaining immigrant status for permanent residence in the Republic of AzerbaijanSocial Protection Fund Determining occupational pensionsNational Archive Department Archive references to legal and physical personsService for Mobilization and Conscription Military registrationMinistry of Economics Issuance of licensesFood Safety Agency Certification and registration

 Mobile "ASAN service" 

From June 1, 2013, mobile buses equipped with the latest technological equipments are used to provide services to citizens who can not come to the centers to use the services provided by  "ASAN service". Mobile buses stay in each region for about two weeks. Currently, the number of served mobile buses is ten. Citizens registered in Baku and Sumgayit can also use this service. To date, more than 1,500,000 applications have been sent to ASAN mobile services.

 Mobile "ASAN Train" 

In accordance with the instruction of the President of the Republic of Azerbaijan, Mr. Ilham Aliyev, the project Mobile "ASAN Train" was developed, equipped with modern technical equipments to provide citizens with public services in regions where there are no "ASAN service" centers. Services are provided by 4 state bodies (Ministry of Justice, Ministry of Internal Affairs, State Committee for Property Issues, Ministry of Labor and Social Protection of Population).

 ASAN Kommunal 

According to the decree of the President Ilham Aliyev in May 2016, the creation of "ASAN Kommunal" centers was entrusted to the State Agency for Public Service and Social Innovations. A number of measures were undertaken in cooperation with relevant institutions in order to create ASAN Kommunal in a short period of time. The centers "ASAN Kommunal" offer 45 types of communal services from Azerigas, Azersu, Azerishig. At present, there are 2 "ASAN Kommunal" centers in Baku.

 Functional support services 

ASAN service centers also provide ticketing services for banking, insurance, legal, medical, broadcast, photo and cultural events.

 Other Services Call-Center 108 Thanks to the Call Center 108 where citizens can get information about the services provided in the "ASAN" service centers, and also address their suggestions and comments. This service was created in 2013.Online QueueTo use the services provided in "ASAN" service centers, you can take online queue by visiting the "ASAN" service web-site.Self-serviceThrough the computers that have access to the Internet in the "ASAN" service centers, citizens have an access to information about public services.Idea-BankThrough the Bank of Ideas, citizens can make their own proposals for the development of the system.Delivery of documents'''

One of the services offered in "ASAN service" centers is "Document Delivery". This pilot project is offered only in "ASAN service" centers No. 1,2,3 and 5.

Service centers

"ASAN service" Experience in the Spotlight of International Community 
Based on the concept of the ASAN service experience, the Government of Afghanistan has established the "Asan Khedmat" public service center, which functions under the auspices of the Ministry of Finance.

Awards 
 Winner of the nomination "Success 2013" for "an effective model of service and contribution to relations between the state and citizens": 2013;
 ISO 9001: 2008 International Management Standards Certificate: 2014;
 Sabirabad "ASAN service" center, standard OHSAS 18001:2007: 2014;
 United Nations Public Service Award: 2015;
 International Safety Award (2015): 2015;
 NETTY-2018 Azerbaijan National Internet Award for the "State Site" nomination: 2018

See also 
 ASAN Imza
 ASAN visa
 The Commission on Combat Corruption of the Republic of Azerbaijan
 Corruption in Azerbaijan
 Open government in Azerbaijan
 Azerbaijan Anti-Corruption Academy
 Anti-money laundering in Azerbaijan

References

External links

Government of Azerbaijan
Government agencies established in 2012
2012 establishments in Azerbaijan